Articles (arranged alphabetically) related to Equatorial Guinea include:



A 
 Abanayop
 Annuaires Afrique
 Anomalías eléctricas
 Afriland First Bank
 Annobón
 Armed Forces of Equatorial Guinea

B 
 Bata, Equatorial Guinea
 Benga people
 Bioko
 Bioko Norte
 Bioko Sur

C 
 Cameroon
 Centro Sur
 Corisco

D 
 Demographics of Equatorial Guinea
 Donato Ndongo-Bidyogo

E 
 Ebebiyín
 Economy of Equatorial Guinea
 Elobey Chico
 Elobey Grande
 Equatoguinean literature in Spanish
 Equatorial Guinea
 Evinayong

F 
 Fernandino peoples
 Fernão do Pó
 Francisco Macías Nguema

G 
 Gabon
 Geography of Equatorial Guinea
 Gulf of Guinea

H 
 History of Equatorial Guinea

I

J 
 Juan Balboa Boneke
 Juan Tomás Ávila Laurel

K 
 Kié-Ntem
 Kwasio language
 Kwasio people

L 
 Lengue people
 Lengue language
 LGBT rights in Equatorial Guinea
 List of cities in Equatorial Guinea
 List of countries by natural gas production
 List of countries by oil production
 Litoral (Equatorial Guinea)
 Luba, Equatorial Guinea

M 
 Malabo
 María Nsué Angüe
 Mark Thatcher
 Mining industry of Equatorial Guinea
 Mongomo
 Music of Equatorial Guinea

N

O

P 
 Politics of Equatorial Guinea

Q

R 
 Provinces of Equatorial Guinea
 Ricardo Mangue Obama Nfubea
 Riggs Bank
 Río Muni

S 
 San Antonio de Palé
 São Tomé and Príncipe
 Simon Mann
 Spanish Guinea

T 
 Telecommunications in Equatorial Guinea
 Teodoro Obiang Nguema Mbasogo
 Transport in Equatorial Guinea

U

V

W 
 Wele-Nzas

X

Y

Z

See also
Lists of country-related topics - similar lists for other countries

 
Equatorial Guinea